Joe Creek is a tributary of the Arkansas River in Tulsa County, Oklahoma.

Local protection project 
Construction began in March, 1978 and was completed in November, 1980. The lower portion of the project was built by a private developer. The project consists of 10,800 feet of channel improvement along Joe Creek, 300 feet along Little Joe Creek, 360 feet along South Fork Creek, and 1,200 feet along the east bank tributary. The 8,950 feet of improved channel upstream is concrete lined; the remainder of the channel has stone side slope protection. The flood of record occurred in October, 1959.

References

Rivers of Oklahoma
Tributaries of the Arkansas River
Rivers of  Tulsa County, Oklahoma